Bombs Away may refer to:

Books, Film and TV
Bombs Away: The Story of a Bomber Team, a 1942 nonfiction book by John Steinbeck
 "Bombs Away", an episode of American television series NYPD Blue (Season 2)

Music
 Bombs Away (group), electro artists, 2010
 Bombs Away (album), 2014 album by Sheppard

Songs
 "Bombs Away", a song on the 1978 album Heaven Help the Fool by Bob Weir
 "Bombs Away", a song on the 1989 album Cruel, Crazy Beautiful World by Johnny Clegg and Savuka
 "Bombs Away", a song on the 1984 album Glorious Results of a Misspent Youth by Joan Jett and the Blackhearts
 "Bombs Away", a song on the 2004 album Like You Like an Arsonist by the band Paris, Texas
 "Bombs Away", a song on the 2006 album The War Back Home by The Ducky Boys
 "Bombs Away", a song on the 1995 album When God Dies by Uncle Slam
 "Bombs Away", a song on the 2007 album Win Us Over by ASG
 "Bombs Away", a song on the 1980 album Zenyatta Mondatta by The Police
 "Bombs Away", a song on the 1995 album Hoss by Lagwagon
 "Bombs Away", a song on the 2011 album Future History by Jason Derulo
 "Bombs Away", a song on the 2012 album Strange Clouds by B.o.B. featuring actor Morgan Freeman
 "Bombs Away", a song on the 2014 album Wonderful, Glorious by EELS
 "Bombs Away", a song on the 2014 album Mandrake By The Shell Corporation
 "Bombs Away", a song on the 2017 album Ambitions by ONE OK ROCK